The 2003–04 NBA season was the Spurs' 28th season in the National Basketball Association, the 31st in San Antonio, and 37th season as a franchise.

The Spurs entered the season as defending NBA champions, having defeated the New Jersey Nets in the 2003 NBA Finals in six games to win their second NBA championship. During the offseason, David Robinson, Danny Ferry, and Steve Kerr retired, Speedy Claxton signed with the Golden State Warriors, Stephen Jackson signed with the Atlanta Hawks, and Steve Smith signed with the New Orleans Hornets; in addition, the Spurs acquired Hedo Türkoğlu and Ron Mercer in a three-team trade, signed free agent Robert Horry (who had won championships with the Houston Rockets and the Los Angeles Lakers) and signed other free agents such as center Radoslav Nesterović. Despite the retirement of Robinson, and despite having a won-loss percentage of approximately .500 in November, the Spurs posted a 13-game winning streak in January and won their final eleven games of the season. The team finished second in the Midwest Division with a 57–25 record. Two-time MVP Tim Duncan was selected for the 2004 NBA All-Star Game.

The Spurs defeated the Memphis Grizzlies in four straight games in the first round of the playoffs. Although the Spurs took the first two games in a second-round rematch against the Los Angeles Lakers (the team they had eliminated in the previous season's Western Conference Semifinals), the Lakers, led by their "big four" of Karl Malone, Shaquille O'Neal, Kobe Bryant, and Gary Payton, responded by taking the next four games to eliminate the defending champions. The Lakers went on to reach the NBA Finals, where they lost to the Detroit Pistons in five games.

Following the season, Turkoglu signed as a free agent with the Orlando Magic and Kevin Willis signed with the Atlanta Hawks.

Draft picks

Roster

Regular season

Season standings

z - clinched division title
y - clinched division title
x - clinched playoff spot

Record vs. opponents

Game log

Regular season 

|- bgcolor="#ccffcc"
| 1
| October 28
| Denver
| 
| Tim Duncan (24)
| Tim Duncan (12)
| Anthony Carter (6)
| SBC Center18,797
| 1–0
|- bgcolor="#ffcccc"
| 2
| October 29
| @ Denver
| 
| Tim Duncan (17)
| Tim Duncan (21)
| Manu Ginóbili (6)
| Pepsi Center17,429
| 1–1

|- bgcolor="#ccffcc"
| 3
| November 1
| New York
| 
| Tim Duncan (15)
| Tim Duncan (15)
| Manu Ginóbili (5)
| SBC Center18,797
| 2–1
|- bgcolor="#ffcccc"
| 4
| November 3
| @ Memphis
| 
| Rasho Nesterovic, Manu Ginóbili (13)
| Rasho Nesterovic (14)
| Jason Hart (8)
| Pyramid Arena12,821
| 2–2
|- bgcolor="#ccffcc"
| 5
| November 4
| Miami
| 
| Manu Ginóbili (15)
| Malik Rose (11)
| Manu Ginóbili (5)
| SBC Center17,666
| 3–2
|- bgcolor="#ffcccc"
| 6
| November 6
| L. A. Lakers
| 
| Manu Ginóbili (33)
| Manu Ginóbili (12)
| Manu Ginóbili (7)
| SBC Center18,797
| 3–3
|- bgcolor="#ffcccc"
| 7
| November 8
| Dallas
| 
| Malik Rose (20)
| Malik Rose (22)
| Manu Ginóbili (7)
| SBC Center18,797
| 3–4
|- bgcolor="#ccffcc"
| 8
| November 10
| Utah
| 
| Manu Ginóbili (18)
| Tim Duncan (10)
| Tim Duncan (5)
| SBC Center18,797
| 4–4
|- bgcolor="#ccffcc"
| 9
| November 12
| @ New Jersey
| 
| Tim Duncan (31)
| Tim Duncan (12)
| Tony Parker (4)
| Continental Airlines Arena13,286
| 5–4
|- bgcolor="#ffcccc"
| 10
| November 14
| @ Philadelphia
| 
| Tim Duncan (35)
| Tim Duncan (15)
| Manu Ginóbili (8)
| Wachovia Center20,344
| 5–5
|- bgcolor="#ccffcc"
| 11
| November 15
| @ Washington
| 
| Malik Rose (23)
| Tim Duncan (13)
| Hedo Turkoglu, Bruce Bowen, Jason Hart (5)
| MCI Center20,173
| 6–5
|- bgcolor="#ccffcc"
| 12
| November 18
| Golden State
| 
| Tim Duncan (21)
| Tim Duncan (10)
| Tony Parker (6)
| SBC Center17,098
| 7–5
|- bgcolor="#ffcccc"
| 13
| November 20
| @ Dallas
| 
| Tim Duncan (30)
| Tim Duncan (17)
| Tony Parker (9)
| American Airlines Center19,989
| 7–6
|- bgcolor="#ccffcc"
| 14
| November 21
| Atlanta
| 
| Tim Duncan (25)
| Tim Duncan (10)
| Tony Parker (6)
| SBC Center18,797
| 8–6
|- bgcolor="#ccffcc"
| 15
| November 26
| Chicago
| 
| Manu Ginóbili (17)
| Manu Ginóbili (11)
| Manu Ginóbili (8)
| SBC Center16,771
| 9–6
|- bgcolor="#ffcccc"
| 16
| November 28
| @ L. A. Lakers
| 
| Manu Ginóbili (13)
| Tim Duncan (11)
| Manu Ginóbili, Kevin Willis (4)
| STAPLES Center18,997
| 9–7
|- bgcolor="#ffcccc"
| 17
| November 29
| @ Golden State
| 
| Tim Duncan (27)
| Tim Duncan (15)
| Manu Ginóbili (6)
| The Arena in Oakland17,680
| 9–8

|- bgcolor="#ffcccc"
| 18
| December 1
| @ L. A. Clippers
| 
| Malik Rose (26)
| Malik Rose (11)
| Manu Ginóbili (5)
| STAPLES Center12,514
| 9–9
|- bgcolor="#ffcccc"
| 19
| December 3
| L. A. Lakers
| 
| Tim Duncan (30)
| Tim Duncan (15)
| Manu Ginóbili (4)
| SBC Center18,841
| 9–10
|- bgcolor="#ccffcc"
| 20
| December 5
| @ Orlando
| 
| Tim Duncan (47)
| Tim Duncan (12)
| Tony Parker (11)
| TD Waterhouse Centre15,394
| 10–10
|- bgcolor="#ccffcc"
| 21
| December 6
| @ Miami
| 
| Tim Duncan, Rasho Nesterovic (21)
| Tim Duncan (19)
| Tony Parker (11)
| AmericanAirlines Arena14,603
| 11–10
|- bgcolor="#ccffcc"
| 22
| December 8
| @ Chicago
| 
| Manu Ginóbili (26)
| Tim Duncan (14)
| Tony Parker (7)
| United Center18,233
| 12–10
|- bgcolor="#ccffcc"
| 23
| December 10
| Portland
| 
| Tim Duncan (18)
| Tim Duncan (14)
| Manu Ginóbili, Tony Parker (6)
| SBC Center15,131
| 13–10
|- bgcolor="#ccffcc"
| 24
| December 11
| @ Houston
| 
| Tim Duncan (22)
| Rasho Nesterovic (11)
| Tony Parker (10)
| Toyota Center18,170
| 14–10
|- bgcolor="#ccffcc"
| 25
| December 13
| Houston
| 
| Manu Ginóbili (16)
| Tim Duncan (12)
| Tony Parker (12)
| SBC Center18,797
| 15–10
|- bgcolor="#ccffcc"
| 26
| December 15
| Memphis
| 
| Tim Duncan (21)
| Rasho Nesterovic (15)
| Manu Ginóbili (8)
| SBC Center14,524
| 16–10
|- bgcolor="#ccffcc"
| 27
| December 17
| Toronto
| 
| Tim Duncan (30)
| Tim Duncan (13)
| Tim Duncan (5)
| SBC Center16,375
| 17–10
|- bgcolor="#ccffcc"
| 28
| December 19
| @ Seattle
| 
| Tim Duncan (27)
| Tim Duncan (20)
| Hedo Turkoglu (6)
| KeyArena15,712
| 18–10
|- bgcolor="#ccffcc"
| 29
| December 20
| @ Portland
| 
| Tim Duncan (26)
| Tim Duncan (10)
| Tony Parker (10)
| Rose Garden Arena15,010
| 19–10
|- bgcolor="#ccffcc"
| 30
| December 23
| L. A. Clippers
| 
| Tim Duncan (22)
| Tim Duncan (10)
| Tony Parker (14)
| SBC Center18,797
| 20–10
|- bgcolor="#ccffcc"
| 31
| December 26
| Orlando
| 
| Tim Duncan (27)
| Tim Duncan (16)
| Manu Ginóbili (7)
| SBC Center18,797
| 21–10
|- bgcolor="#ccffcc"
| 32
| December 28
| Milwaukee
| 
| Manu Ginóbili (25)
| Tim Duncan (15)
| Tony Parker (5)
| SBC Center18,797
| 22–10

|- bgcolor="#ffcccc"
| 33
| January 3
| Philadelphia
| 
| Hedo Turkoglu (16)
| Tim Duncan (12)
| Tony Parker (5)
| SBC Center18,797
| 22–11
|- bgcolor="#ccffcc"
| 34
| January 5
| @ Denver
| 
| Tim Duncan (30)
| Tim Duncan (12)
| Tim Duncan (7)
| Pepsi Center15,120
| 23–11
|- bgcolor="#ccffcc"
| 35
| January 6
| Washington
| 
| Tim Duncan, Tony Parker (16)
| Tim Duncan (11)
| Tim Duncan (6)
| SBC Center16,413
| 24–11
|- bgcolor="#ccffcc"
| 36
| January 9
| @ New Orleans
| 
| Tim Duncan, Bruce Bowen (15)
| Rasho Nesterovic (9)
| Tony Parker (8)
| New Orleans Arena17,740
| 25–11
|- bgcolor="#ccffcc"
| 37
| January 10
| Indiana
| 
| Tim Duncan (30)
| Tim Duncan (15)
| Tony Parker (7)
| SBC Center18,797
| 26–11
|- bgcolor="#ffcccc"
| 38
| January 13
| @ Atlanta
| 
| Tim Duncan (28)
| Tim Duncan (9)
| Bruce Bowen (3)
| Philips Arena11,807
| 26–12
|- bgcolor="#ffcccc"
| 39
| January 14
| Minnesota
| 
| Tim Duncan (36)
| Tim Duncan (20)
| Tim Duncan (7)
| SBC Center17,411
| 26–13
|- bgcolor="#ffcccc"
| 40
| January 16
| @ Indiana
| 
| Tim Duncan (16)
| Robert Horry (10)
| Tim Duncan, Manu Ginóbili (7)
| Conseco Fieldhouse18,044
| 26–14
|- bgcolor="#ccffcc"
| 41
| January 18
| @ Boston
| 
| Rasho Nesterovic (23)
| Rasho Nesterovic (13)
| Hedo Turkoglu (7)
| FleetCenter18,624
| 27–14
|- bgcolor="#ffcccc"
| 42
| January 19
| @ Detroit
| 
| Tim Duncan (17)
| Tim Duncan (10)
| Tim Duncan (6)
| The Palace of Auburn Hills22,076
| 27–15
|- bgcolor="#ccffcc"
| 43
| January 21
| New Jersey
| 
| Tim Duncan (21)
| Tim Duncan (17)
| Tim Duncan (5)
| SBC Center17,441
| 28–15
|- bgcolor="#ccffcc"
| 44
| January 23
| @ Phoenix
| 
| Tim Duncan (25)
| Tim Duncan (12)
| Tim Duncan (5)
| America West Arena17,799
| 29–15
|- bgcolor="#ffcccc"
| 45
| January 24
| New Orleans
| 
| Malik Rose (20)
| Tim Duncan (13)
| Manu Ginóbili (5)
| SBC Center17,897
| 29–16
|- bgcolor="#ffcccc"
| 46
| January 26
| @ Milwaukee
| 
| Tony Parker (26)
| Tim Duncan (8)
| Tony Parker (6)
| Bradley Center14,385
| 29–17
|- bgcolor="#ccffcc"
| 47
| January 27
| @ New York
| 
| Tim Duncan (30)
| Tim Duncan (19)
| Manu Ginóbili (6)
| Madison Square Garden19,190
| 30–17
|- bgcolor="#ffcccc"
| 48
| January 29
| Sacramento
| 
| Tim Duncan (35)
| Tim Duncan (8)
| Tony Parker (6)
| SBC Center17,669
| 30–18
|- bgcolor="#ccffcc"
| 49
| January 31
| Utah
| 
| Tim Duncan (33)
| Tim Duncan (14)
| Tim Duncan, Manu Ginóbili, Tony Parker (3)
| SBC Center18,797
| 31–18

|- bgcolor="#ccffcc"
| 50
| February 2
| Utah
| @ 
| Tim Duncan (31)
| Tim Duncan (11)
| Tony Parker (6)
| Delta Center19,911
| 32–18
|- bgcolor="#ccffcc"
| 51
| February 5
| Seattle
| @ 
| Tim Duncan (23)
| Tim Duncan (14)
| Tony Parker (5)
| KeyArena15,256
| 33–18
|- bgcolor="#ccffcc"
| 52
| February 6
| Sacramento
| @ 
| Tim Duncan (28)
| Tim Duncan (14)
| Tony Parker (7)
| ARCO Arena17,317
| 34–18
|- bgcolor="#ccffcc"
| 53
| February 9
| Houston
| @ 
| Tim Duncan (28)
| Tim Duncan (10)
| Tony Parker (9)
| Toyota Center16,040
| 35–18
|- align="center"
|colspan="9" bgcolor="#bbcaff"|All-Star Break
|- bgcolor="#ccffcc"
| 54
| February 18
| Toronto
| @ 
| Tim Duncan (26)
| Tim Duncan (21)
| Tony Parker (3)
| Air Canada Centre17,119
| 36–18
|- bgcolor="#ffcccc"
| 55
| February 20
| Cleveland
| @ 
| Tim Duncan, Manu Ginóbili (21)
| Tim Duncan (12)
| Tony Parker (5)
| Gund Arena20,562
| 36–19
|- bgcolor="#ccffcc"
| 56
| February 22
| Minnesota
| @ 
| Tony Parker (26)
| Hedo Turkoglu (14)
| Manu Ginóbili (6)
| Target Center20,347
| 37–19
|- bgcolor="#ccffcc"
| 57
| February 24
| Houston
| 
| Tim Duncan (27)
| Tim Duncan (13)
| Tony Parker (7)
| SBC Center18,797
| 38–19
|- bgcolor="#ffcccc"
| 58
| February 26
| @ Dallas
| 
| Tim Duncan (22)
| Tim Duncan (17)
| Hedo Turkoglu, Charlie Ward (4)
| American Airlines Center20,458
| 38–20
|- bgcolor="#ccffcc"
| 59
| February 28
| Denver
| 
| Tony Parker (29)
| Rasho Nesterovic (12)
| Manu Ginóbili (5)
| SBC Center18,797
| 39–20

|- bgcolor="#ffcccc"
| 60
| March 1
| Memphis
| 
| Hedo Turkoglu (19)
| Rasho Nesterovic, Malik Rose (10)
| Manu Ginóbili (9)
| SBC Center16,705
| 39–21
|- bgcolor="#ccffcc"
| 61
| March 3
| Seattle
| 
| Hedo Turkoglu (18)
| Rasho Nesterovic (12)
| Tony Parker (7)
| SBC Center16,611
| 40–21
|- bgcolor="#ccffcc"
| 62
| March 5
| Dallas
| 
| Tony Parker (27)
| Rasho Nesterovic (15)
| Rasho Nesterovic, Tony Parker (5)
| SBC Center18,797
| 41–21
|- bgcolor="#ccffcc"
| 63
| March 6
| @ Phoenix
| 
| Rasho Nesterovic (22)
| Rasho Nesterovic (13)
| Rasho Nesterovic, Tony Parker (5)
| America West Arena16,039
| 42–21
|- bgcolor="#ffcccc"
| 64
| March 9
| @ Memphis
| 
| Tony Parker (24)
| Malik Rose (14)
| Tony Parker (7)
| Pyramid Arena15,544
| 42–22
|- bgcolor="#ccffcc"
| 65
| March 10
| L. A. Clippers
| 
| Malik Rose (21)
| Malik Rose (12)
| Manu Ginóbili (8)
| SBC Center16,919
| 43–22
|- bgcolor="#ccffcc"
| 66
| March 12
| Golden State
| 
| Malik Rose (17)
| Hedo Turkoglu (9)
| Tony Parker (12)
| SBC Center17,174
| 44–22
|- bgcolor="#ffcccc"
| 67
| March 14
| @ Sacramento
| 
| Manu Ginóbili (16)
| Rasho Nesterovic (13)
| Tony Parker (5)
| ARCO Arena17,317
| 44–23
|- bgcolor="#ffcccc"
| 68
| March 15
| @ Golden State
| 
| Tony Parker (29)
| Rasho Nesterovic (7)
| Tony Parker (6)
| The Arena in Oakland14,153
| 44–24
|- bgcolor="#ccffcc"
| 69
| March 18
| Minnesota
| 
| Tim Duncan (22)
| Tim Duncan (10)
| Tony Parker, Hedo Turkoglu (7)
| SBC Center18,797
| 45–24
|- bgcolor="#ccffcc"
| 70
| March 20
| Boston
| 
| Tim Duncan, Manu Ginóbili (26)
| Tim Duncan (15)
| Tony Parker (5)
| SBC Center19,034
| 46–24
|- bgcolor="#ffcccc"
| 71
| March 23
| @ Minnesota
| 
| Tim Duncan (26)
| Hedo Turkoglu (15)
| Tony Parker (12)
| Target Center20,111
| 46–25
|- bgcolor="#ccffcc"
| 72
| March 25
| Detroit
| 
| Manu Ginóbili (17)
| Tim Duncan (13)
| Tony Parker (7)
| SBC Center17,695
| 47–25
|- bgcolor="#ccffcc"
| 73
| March 27
| Phoenix
| 
| Hedo Turkoglu, Tim Duncan (14)
| Tim Duncan (10)
| Tony Parker, Manu Ginóbili, Devin Brown (5)
| SBC Center18,797
| 48–25
|- bgcolor="#ccffcc"
| 74
| March 29
| Cleveland
| 
| Manu Ginóbili (21)
| Manu Ginóbili (8)
| Tim Duncan, Hedo Turkoglu, Tony Parker, Robert Horry (3)
| SBC Center18,797
| 49–25
|- bgcolor="#ccffcc"
| 75
| March 31
| Sacramento
| 
| Manu Ginóbili (29)
| Tim Duncan, Hedo Turkoglu, Rasho Nesterovic (7)
| Tony Parker (6)
| SBC Center18,797
| 50–25

|- bgcolor="#ccffcc"
| 76
| April 2
| @ Utah
| 
| Devin Brown (19)
| Tim Duncan, Rasho Nesterovic (10)
| Tony Parker (5)
| Delta Center19,911
| 51–25
|- bgcolor="#ccffcc"
| 77
| April 4
| @ L. A. Lakers
| 
| Tony Parker (29)
| Tim Duncan (13)
| Tony Parker (9)
| STAPLES Center18,997
| 52–25
|- bgcolor="#ccffcc"
| 78
| April 7
| Seattle
| 
| Tim Duncan (21)
| Tim Duncan, Rasho Nesterovic (10)
| Tim Duncan, Rasho Nesterovic, Hedo Turkoglu, Tony Parker, Manu Ginóbili (3)
| SBC Center18,797
| 53–25
|- bgcolor="#ccffcc"
| 79
| April 9
| Portland
| 
| Tim Duncan, Manu Ginóbili (21)
| Tim Duncan (14)
| Manu Ginóbili (5)
| SBC Center18,797
| 54–25
|- bgcolor="#ccffcc"
| 80
| April 11
| @ L. A. Clippers
| 
| Tim Duncan (26)
| Tim Duncan (9)
| Tony Parker (8)
| STAPLES Center18,031
| 55–25
|- bgcolor="#ccffcc"
| 81
| April 12
| @ Portland
| 
| Tony Parker (22)
| Tim Duncan (15)
| Tony Parker (5)
| Rose Garden Arena18,997
| 56–25
|- bgcolor="#ccffcc"
| 82
| April 14
| Denver
| 
| Tim Duncan (23)
| Tim Duncan (16)
| Manu Ginóbili (5)
| SBC Center18,797
| 57–25

Playoffs

|- align="center" bgcolor="#ccffcc"
| 1
| April 17
| Memphis
| W 98–74
| Tim Duncan (26)
| Tim Duncan (9)
| Tony Parker (8)
| SBC Center18,797
| 1–0
|- align="center" bgcolor="#ccffcc"
| 2
| April 19
| Memphis
| W 87–70
| Tony Parker (27)
| Tim Duncan (12)
| Tony Parker (7)
| SBC Center18,797
| 2–0
|- align="center" bgcolor="#ccffcc"
| 3
| April 22
| @ Memphis
| W 95–93
| Tim Duncan (22)
| Tim Duncan (13)
| Tony Parker (6)
| The Pyramid19,351
| 3–0
|- align="center" bgcolor="#ccffcc"
| 4
| April 25
| @ Memphis
| W 110–97
| Tony Parker (29)
| Duncan, Horry (6)
| Tony Parker (13)
| The Pyramid19,351
| 4–0
|-

|- align="center" bgcolor="#ccffcc"
| 1
| May 2
| L.A. Lakers
| W 88–78
| Tim Duncan (30)
| Tim Duncan (11)
| Tony Parker (9)
| SBC Center18,797
| 1–0
|- align="center" bgcolor="#ccffcc"
| 2
| May 5
| L.A. Lakers
| W 95–85
| Tony Parker (30)
| Bowen, Duncan (7)
| Manu Ginóbili (6)
| SBC Center18,797
| 2–0
|- align="center" bgcolor="#ffcccc"
| 3
| May 9
| @ L.A. Lakers
| L 81–105
| Manu Ginóbili (17)
| Tim Duncan (13)
| Tony Parker (5)
| Staples Center18,997
| 2–1
|- align="center" bgcolor="#ffcccc"
| 4
| May 11
| @ L.A. Lakers
| L 90–98
| Manu Ginóbili (21)
| Tim Duncan (10)
| Duncan, Parker (8)
| Staples Center18,997
| 2–2
|- align="center" bgcolor="#ffcccc"
| 5
| May 13
| L.A. Lakers
| L 73–74
| Tim Duncan (21)
| Tim Duncan (21)
| Tony Parker (6)
| SBC Center18,797
| 2–3
|- align="center" bgcolor="#ffcccc"
| 6
| May 15
| @ L.A. Lakers
| L 76–88
| Tim Duncan (20)
| Tim Duncan (11)
| Manu Ginóbili (4)
| Staples Center18,997
| 2–4
|-

Player statistics

Regular season

Playoffs

Awards and records
Tim Duncan, All-NBA First Team
Bruce Bowen, NBA All-Defensive First Team
Tim Duncan, NBA All-Defensive Second Team

Transactions

References

See also
2003-04 NBA season

San Antonio Spurs seasons
San Antonio
San Antonio
San Antonio